Andala is a monotypic tiger moth genus in the family Erebidae. Its only species, Andala unifascia, is found in the north-western Himalayas, Murree and Kussowlee. Both the genus and species were first described by Francis Walker in 1855.

References

Spilosomina
Moths described in 1855
Monotypic moth genera
Moths of Asia